Ferry Petterson (28 August 1938 – 27 November 2000) was a Dutch footballer. He played in two matches for the Netherlands national football team in 1962.

References

External links
 

1938 births
2000 deaths
Dutch footballers
Netherlands international footballers
Place of birth missing
Association footballers not categorized by position